The national flag of Anguilla, a British overseas territory, consists of a Blue Ensign with the British flag in the canton, charged with the coat of arms of Anguilla in the fly. The coat of arms consists of three dolphins in a circular formation, which were featured on the earlier Anguillan flag, and which stand for friendship, wisdom and strength. The white in the background stands for peace, and the light blue represents the sea, as well as faith, youth, and hope.

The flag is Anguilla's third flag other than as part of Saint Christopher-Nevis-Anguilla. The island's first flag was a red flag featuring the name of the island in yellow and two mermaids inside a blue oval. Variants to this flag were also widely used, with some substituting red for purple and some not bearing the name of Anguilla. This flag was widely disliked and was replaced during Anguilla's brief period of independence by the Dolphin Flag, which is still widely seen around the island. This flag was a banner of the arms found on the current Blue Ensign, and was white with a broad blue band across the base of the flag, above which were three stylised golden dolphins.

The Blue Ensign for Anguilla was adopted in 1990. It is used on land; it is also used at sea by vessels operated by the Government of Anguilla. Anguilla's civil ensign - that is the ensign worn on civilian vessels registered in Anguilla - is the undifferenced Red Ensign, commonly used as a civil ensign throughout the British Empire. Anguilla has not yet adopted a distinctive version of the Red Ensign. Ashore, the dolphin flag is commonly used as an all-purpose civil flag, either in place of or in addition to the Blue Ensign. The Union Jack defaced with the Anguilla coat of arms is used by the Governor, which is the traditional design for Governors of the British overseas territories. 
A modification of the flag was reported on January 25, 1999, in the British Navy flag book as Change No. 5 1999: The dimensions of the badge have been slightly altered and the coat of arms lost its golden border.

References 

Government of Anguilla - About Anguilla - National Symbols - National Flags
Flag of Anguilla - A Brief History

External links 

 

Flag
National flags
Blue Ensigns
Flags of British Overseas Territories
Flags introduced in 1990
Anguilla